The thousands of Catholic churches are grouped in a number of lists, mainly by country. Many more are not (yet) grouped in lists, but can be accessed through the category tree :Category:Roman Catholic church buildings.

By country
List of Catholic churches in Albania
List of cathedrals in Albania#Roman Catholic
List of Catholic churches in Algeria
List of Catholic churches in Argentina
List of cathedrals in Argentina#Roman Catholic
List of Catholic churches in Australia
List of cathedrals in Australia#Roman Catholic
List of Catholic churches in Austria
List of cathedrals in Austria#Roman Catholic
List of Catholic churches in Belarus
List of cathedrals in Belarus#Roman Catholic
List of Catholic churches in Belgium
List of cathedrals in Belgium#Roman Catholic
List of Catholic churches in Bolivia
List of cathedrals in Bolivia#Roman Catholic
List of Catholic churches in Brazil
List of cathedrals in Brazil#Roman Catholic
List of Catholic churches in Bulgaria
List of cathedrals in Bulgaria#Roman Catholic
List of Catholic churches in Canada
List of cathedrals in Canada#Roman Catholic
List of Roman Catholic churches in Toronto
List of Catholic churches in Chile
List of cathedrals in Chile#Roman Catholic
List of Catholic churches in China
List of cathedrals in the People's Republic of China#Roman Catholic
List of Catholic churches in Colombia
List of cathedrals in Colombia#Roman Catholic
List of Catholic churches in Costa Rica
List of cathedrals in Costa Rica#Roman Catholic
List of Catholic churches in Croatia
List of cathedrals in Croatia#Roman Catholic
List of Catholic churches in Cyprus
List of Catholic churches in the Czech Republic
List of cathedrals in the Czech Republic#Roman Catholic
List of Catholic churches in Denmark
List of cathedrals in Denmark#Roman Catholic
List of Catholic churches in Ecuador
List of cathedrals in Ecuador#Roman Catholic
List of Catholic churches in El Salvador
List of cathedrals in El Salvador#Roman Catholic
List of Catholic churches in Eritrea
List of Catholic churches in Estonia
List of cathedrals in Estonia#Roman Catholic
List of Catholic churches in Ethiopia
List of Catholic churches in Finland
List of cathedrals in Finland#Roman Catholic
List of Catholic churches in France
List of basilicas in France
List of cathedrals in France#Roman Catholic
List of Catholic churches in Gabon
List of Catholic churches in the Gambia
List of Catholic churches in Georgia (country)
List of Catholic churches in Germany
List of cathedrals in Germany#Roman Catholic
List of Catholic churches in Ghana
List of cathedrals in Ghana#Roman Catholic
List of Catholic churches in Greece
List of Catholic churches in Guatemala
List of cathedrals in Guatemala#Roman Catholic
List of Catholic churches in Guinea
List of Catholic churches in Haiti
List of cathedrals in Haiti#Roman Catholic
List of Catholic churches in Honduras
List of cathedrals in Honduras#Roman Catholic
List of Catholic churches in Hong Kong
List of cathedrals in Hong Kong#Roman Catholic
List of Catholic churches in Hungary
List of cathedrals in Hungary#Roman Catholic
List of Catholic churches in Iceland
List of Catholic churches in India
List of cathedrals in India#Roman Catholic
List of Catholic churches in Indonesia
List of cathedrals in Indonesia#Roman Catholic
List of Catholic churches in Ireland
List of cathedrals in Ireland#Roman Catholic
List of Catholic churches in Italy
List of basilicas in Italy
List of cathedrals in Italy#Roman Catholic
List of Catholic churches in Ivory Coast
List of cathedrals in Ivory Coast#Roman Catholic
List of Catholic churches in Jamaica
List of Catholic churches in Japan
List of cathedrals in Japan#Roman Catholic
List of Catholic churches in Kazakhstan
List of cathedrals in Kazakhstan#Roman Catholic
List of Catholic churches in Kenya
List of Catholic churches in Latvia
List of cathedrals in Latvia#Roman Catholic
List of Catholic churches in Lebanon
List of cathedrals in Lebanon#Roman Catholic
List of Catholic churches in Liberia
List of cathedrals in Liberia#Roman Catholic
List of Catholic churches in Lithuania
List of cathedrals in Lithuania#Roman Catholic
List of Catholic churches in Luxembourg
List of Catholic churches in the Republic of Macedonia
List of Catholic churches in Madagascar
List of cathedrals in Madagascar#Roman Catholic
List of Catholic churches in Malawi
List of cathedrals in Malawi#Roman Catholic
List of Catholic churches in Malaysia
List of cathedrals in Malaysia#Roman Catholic
List of Catholic churches in Mali
List of Catholic churches in Malta
List of cathedrals in Malta#Roman Catholic
List of Catholic churches in Mexico
List of cathedrals in Mexico#Roman Catholic
List of Catholic churches in Moldova
List of Catholic churches in Morocco
List of cathedrals in Morocco#Roman Catholic
List of Catholic churches in Mozambique
List of cathedrals in Mozambique#Roman Catholic
List of Catholic churches in Namibia
List of Catholic churches in the Netherlands
List of cathedrals in the Netherlands#Roman Catholic
List of Catholic churches in New Zealand
Basilicas of New Zealand
List of cathedrals in New Zealand#Roman Catholic
List of Catholic churches in Nicaragua
List of cathedrals in Nicaragua#Roman Catholic
List of Catholic churches in Niger
List of Catholic churches in Nigeria
List of cathedrals in Nigeria#Roman Catholic
List of Roman Catholic churches in Port Harcourt
List of Catholic churches in Norway
List of cathedrals in Norway#Roman Catholic
List of Catholic churches in Panama
List of cathedrals in Panama#Roman Catholic
List of Catholic churches in Paraguay
List of cathedrals in Paraguay#Roman Catholic
List of Catholic churches in Peru
List of cathedrals in Peru#Roman Catholic
List of Catholic churches in the Philippines
List of cathedrals in the Philippines#Roman Catholic
List of Catholic churches in Poland
List of cathedrals in Poland#Roman Catholic
List of Catholic churches in Portugal
List of cathedrals in Portugal#Roman Catholic
List of Catholic churches in Puerto Rico
List of Catholic churches in Romania
List of cathedrals in Romania#Roman Catholic
List of Catholic churches in Russia
List of cathedrals in Russia#Roman Catholic
List of Catholic churches in Senegal
List of cathedrals in Senegal#Roman Catholic
List of Catholic churches in Serbia
List of cathedrals in Serbia#Roman Catholic
List of Roman Catholic churches in Singapore
List of Catholic churches in Slovakia
List of cathedrals in Slovakia#Roman Catholic
List of Catholic churches in Slovenia
List of cathedrals in Slovenia#Roman Catholic
List of Catholic churches in South Africa
List of cathedrals in South Africa#Roman Catholic
List of Catholic churches in Spain
List of cathedrals in Spain#List of Roman Catholic Cathedrals
List of Catholic churches in Sri Lanka
List of cathedrals in Sri Lanka#Roman Catholic
List of Catholic churches in Sudan
List of Catholic churches in Suriname
List of Catholic churches in Sweden
List of cathedrals in Sweden#Roman Catholic
List of Catholic churches in Switzerland
List of cathedrals in Switzerland#Roman Catholic
List of Catholic churches in Taiwan
List of cathedrals in Taiwan#Roman Catholic
List of Catholic churches in Tajikistan
List of Catholic churches in Tanzania
List of cathedrals in Tanzania#Roman Catholic
List of Catholic churches in Thailand
List of cathedrals in Thailand#Roman Catholic
List of Catholic churches in Togo
List of Catholic churches in Tunisia
List of Catholic churches in Turkey
List of Catholic churches in Turkmenistan
List of Catholic churches in Uganda
List of Catholic churches in Ukraine
List of cathedrals in Ukraine#Roman Catholic
List of Catholic churches in the United Kingdom
Catholic churches in Leicester
List of cathedrals in the United Kingdom#Roman Catholic
List of Catholic churches in the United States
List of the Catholic cathedrals of the United States
List of Roman Catholic churches in the Archdiocese of Atlanta
List of Roman Catholic churches in the Diocese of Charleston
List of parishes of the Roman Catholic Diocese of Honolulu
List of churches in the Roman Catholic Archdiocese of New York
Catholic churches in Vermont
List of Catholic churches in Uruguay
List of cathedrals in Uruguay#Roman Catholic
List of Catholic churches in Venezuela
List of cathedrals in Venezuela#Roman Catholic
List of Catholic churches in Zambia
List of cathedrals in Zambia#Roman Catholic
List of Catholic churches in Zimbabwe
List of cathedrals in Zimbabwe#Roman Catholic

By type
List of basilicas
Lists of cathedrals (also contains non-Catholic cathedrals)

Lists of churches